Venice is a city in Italy. In historical contexts, the name may refer to the Republic of Venice.

Venice or Venise may also refer to:

Music
 Music of Venice, the city's role in the development of the music of Italy
 Venice (Fennesz album), 2004
 Venice (Anderson Paak album), 2014
 Venice (band), a band from Venice, California
 Venice (musical), first produced in 2010 in Kansas City, Missouri, U.S.

Places

United States
 Venice, Bainbridge Island, Washington, a community of Bainbridge Island
 Venice, Florida, a city in Sarasota County
 Venice, Illinois, a city in Madison County
 Venice, Los Angeles, a neighborhood on the Westside of the city, California
 Venice, Louisiana, an unincorporated community and census-designated place in Plaquemines Parish
 Venice, Missouri, an unincorporated community
 Venice, Nebraska, a census-designated place in Douglas County
 Venice, New York, a town in Cayuga County
 Venice, Ohio, former name of Ross, a census-designated place in Butler County
 Venice, Utah, an unincorporated community in Sevier County

Other places
 Venice, Alberta, Canada, a hamlet in Lac La Biche County
 Venise, Doubs, a commune of the Doubs département, in France
 Klein-Venedig (Little Venice), Venezuela, a 16th-century German colony
 Venice, Zimbabwe, a village in the province of Mashonaland West

Place nicknames
 "Brazilian Venice", nickname for Recife, Brazil
 The Green Venice or Marais Poitevin, a large area of marshland in western France
 "Venice of America", nickname for Fort Lauderdale, Florida, U.S.
 Venice of Cieszyn, part of the Old Town of Cieszyn, Poland
 Venice of Portugal, nickname for Aveiro, Portugal
 Venice of the East, a list of places with this nickname
 Venice of the North, a list of places with this nickname
 Venice of the Orient, nickname for Shanghai, China
 "Venice of the Pacific", nickname for the ruins of Nan Madol at Pohnpei

Other uses
 Venice Kamel Gouda (born 1934), Egyptian research professor and a former Minister of State for Scientific Research
 Venice (film), a 2014 Cuban drama film
 Venice (video game), a 2007 action puzzle game
 Venice, the production code for a type of AMD64 CPU
 Venice/Venice, a 1992 American drama film
 Venice 24/7, a 2012 British documentary TV series
 Venice, from the Porch of Madonna della Salute, an 1835 painting by J. M. W. Turner
 Venice: The Series, a soap opera web series
 Sony VENICE, a Sony E-mount camera
 Venices (book), a 1971 book by Paul Morand

See also
 Venice in media, a list of references to Venice, Italy, in various media
 Venecia (disambiguation)
 Venetia (disambiguation)
 Venetian (disambiguation)
 Venezia (disambiguation)
 Little Venice (disambiguation)
 Venice Township (disambiguation)